The Beuthen Jewish Community was one of twenty-five Jewish communities of the district of Oppeln, established in the city of Beuthen (now Bytom, Poland) with a Jewish primary school supported by the city, a religious school, 13 charitable societies, and 4 institutions, prior to German invasion of Poland in World War II. Jews lived there as early as 1421. Beuthen had been a border–town between Germany and the Second Polish Republic since the plebiscite of 1922. The new German-Polish border passed just east of Beuthen, so that neighbouring Katowice became part of Poland, while Beuthen remained in Germany. The area, however, was kept as an economic unit, with guarantees on the movement of goods, material, and labour.

The Jewish population of Beuthen during the inter-war period was about 3,500 (according to Mokotov) or 5,000 according to a former resident, who recalls that approximately 4,000 of them left Beuthen between 1933 and 1939. In November 1938 (after 9 November), Joseph Goebbels delivered a fiery anti-Semitic tirade in Beuthen, with a call for vengeance, just after the Kristallnacht (the Night of Broken Glass). The Jews were made to stand for hours in front of their burning synagogue, which had been built in 1869. 

During World War II, Beuthen's Jews, numbering approximately 1,300, became the first ever Holocaust transport to be gassed inside "Bunker I" at Auschwitz-Birkenau death camp, all murdered on 15 February 1942 at the onset of the Nazi German Holocaust in Poland.

See also
Bytom Synagogue

References

 Steve Friedlander,  Beuthen
  Synagogue in Beuthen, Germany  (now Bytom, Poland). 

Bytom
Jewish communities in Germany